The Sound of the Golden Hurricane is the school marching band for the University of Tulsa, based in Tulsa, Oklahoma.  The band is currently under the direction of Mr. Andrew Anderson; overseen by the Director of Instrumental Ensembles, Mr. Richard Wagner.  The percussion section of the band is directed by Mr. Cole Williams, and the band's colorguard is directed by Ms. Adrienne Gaddy.  It specializes in performing a variety of music geared to crowd entertainment, and performs in a multitude of styles during TU athletic events.   The band performs a different halftime show for almost every home game throughout each football season, and introduced a new pre-game routine in 2013.  The Sound debuted new uniforms during the 2016 season, featuring the first new uniform design for the group since the early 1990s.

The band performs at every home game for the Golden Hurricane football team in Chapman Stadium, as well as selected away games and bowl appearances.  The band also performs at many men's and women's basketball games at the University of Tulsa's Reynolds Center.  The band has appeared on several Tulsa news stations and ESPN broadcasts of TU football games. The band has performed at several bowl games, including the Independence Bowl, GMAC Bowl, Harvest Bowl, Liberty Bowl, Miami Beach Bowl, and the inaugural Armed Forces Bowl. 

The Sound of the Golden Hurricane is officially considered a part of the TU curriculum: students may earn academic credit for marching in the band, though this is not mandatory for participation. The band boasts a very high rate of undergraduate participation; 3.5% of the total undergraduate student population are members of the band, a rate only eclipsed at the FBS collegiate level by the Band of the Fighting Irish from the University of Notre Dame.

References

University of Tulsa
American Athletic Conference marching bands